Hair fetishism, also known as hair partialism and trichophilia, is a partialism in which a person sees hair most commonly, head hair as particularly erotic and sexually arousing. Arousal may occur from seeing or touching hair, whether head hair, armpit hair, chest hair or fur. Head-hair arousal may come from seeing or touching very long or short hair, wet hair, certain colors of hair or a particular hairstyle. Pubephilia is sexual arousal at the sight or feel of pubic hair.

Haircut fetishism is a related paraphilia in which a person is aroused by having their head hair cut or shaved, by cutting the hair of another, by watching someone get a haircut, or by seeing someone with a shaved head or very short hair.

Etymology 
The word trichophilia comes from the Greek "trica-" (τρίχα), which means hair, and the suffix "-philia" (φιλία), which means love.

Characteristics
Hair is one of the defining characteristics of mammals. In humans, hair can be scalp hair, facial hair, chest hair, pubic hair, axillary hair, besides other places. Men tend to have hair in more places than women. Hair does not in itself have any intrinsic sexual value other than the attributes given to it by individuals in a cultural context. Some cultures are ambivalent in relation to body hair, with some being regarded as attractive while others being regarded as unaesthetic. Many cultures regard a woman's hair to be erotic. For example, many Muslim women cover their hair in public, and display it only to their family and close friends. Similarly, many Jewish women cover their hair after marriage. During the Middle Ages, European women were expected to cover their hair after they married, and according to the New Testament, a Christian woman should cover her head while in a church or in prayer.

Even in cultures where women do not customarily cover their hair, the erotic significance of hair is recognised. Some hair styles are culturally associated with a particular gender, with short head hair styles and baldness being associated with men and longer hair styles with women and girls, even though there are many exceptions such as Gaelic Irish men, and also depictions of men in art throughout history, the most notable example probably being that of Jesus Christ. In the case of women especially, head hair has been presented in art and literature as a feature of beauty, vanity and eroticism. Hair has a very important role in the canons of beauty in different regions of the world, and healthy combed hair has two important functions, beauty and fashion. In those cultures, considerable time and expense is put into the attractive presentation of hair and, in some cases, to the removal of culturally unwanted hair. In historical Indian tradition, women have been expected to maintain long hair — customarily tied out of the way, for the sake of practicality and the appearance of neatness — and have been strongly discouraged from cutting it.

Hair fetishism manifests itself in a variety of behaviors. A fetishist may enjoy seeing or touching hair, pulling on or cutting the hair of another person. Besides enjoyment they may become sexually aroused from such activities. It may also be described as an obsession, as in the case of hair washing or dread of losing hair. Arousal by head hair may arise from seeing or touching very long or short hair, wet hair, a certain color of hair or a particular hairstyle. Others may find the attraction of literally "having sex with somebody's hair" as a fantasy or fetish. The fetish affects both men and women.

Some people feel pleasure when their hair is being cut or groomed. This is because they produce endorphins giving them a feeling which is similar to that of a head massage, laughter, or caress. On the other hand, many people feel some level of anxiety when their head hair is being cut. Sigmund Freud stated that cutting woman's long hair by men may represent a fear and/or concept of castration, meaning that a woman's long hair represents a figurative penis and that by cutting off her hair a man may feel dominance as castrator, not the castrated one (while paradoxically also being reassured by the fact that the hair will grow again).

Trichophilia may present with different excitation sources, the most common, but not the only one, being human head hair. Trichophilia may also involve facial hair, chest hair, pubic hair, armpit hair and animal fur. The excitation can arise from the texture, color, hairstyle and hair length. Among the most common variants of this paraphilia are excitation by long hair and short hair, the excitement of blonde hair (blonde fetishism) and red hair (redhead fetishism) and the excitement of the different textures of hair (straight, curly, wavy, etc.). Trichophilia can relate to the excitement that is caused by plucking or pulling hair or body hair.

Trichophilia is considered a paraphilia which is usually inoffensive.

Prevalence

In order to determine the relative prevalence of different fetishes, scientists obtained a sample of at least 5000 individuals worldwide, in 2007, from 381 Internet discussion groups.  The relative prevalences were estimated based on (a) the number of groups devoted to a particular fetish, (b) the number of individuals participating in the groups and (c) the number of messages exchanged.  Of the sampled population, 7 percent were sexually aroused by hair (as opposed to 12 for underwear, but only 4 for genitals, 3 for breasts, 2 for buttocks, and less than one for body hair).

See also 
 Fur fetishism
 Hair theft
 Hairstyle
 Paraphilia
Bear (gay culture)
Armpit fetishism

References 

Paraphilias
Sexual fetishism
Human hair

pt:Parafilia#Algumas parafilias